5283 Pyrrhus  is a large Jupiter trojan from the Greek camp, approximately  in diameter. It was discovered on 31 January 1989, by American astronomer Carolyn Shoemaker at the Palomar Observatory in California. The dark Jovian asteroid belongs to the 100 largest Jupiter trojans and has a rotation period of 7.3 hours. It was named after Achilles son, Neoptolemus (also called Pyrrhus) from Greek mythology.

Orbit and classification 

Pyrrhus is a dark Jovian asteroid orbiting in the leading Greek camp at Jupiter's  Lagrangian point, 60° ahead of the Gas Giant's orbit in a 1:1 resonance . It is also a non-family asteroid in the Jovian background population. It orbits the Sun at a distance of 4.4–6.0 AU once every 11 years and 10 months (4,335 days; semi-major axis of 5.2 AU). Its orbit has an eccentricity of 0.15 and an inclination of 17° with respect to the ecliptic. The body's observation arc begins with a precovery taken at Palomar in November 1951, or more than 37 years prior to its official discovery observation.

Naming 

This minor planet was named by the discoverer from Greek mythology after Achilles son Neoptolemus (see 2260 Neoptolemus) also known as Pyrrhus. His alternative name, Pyrrhus, origins from the red color of his hair. After his father's death, he was brought by Odysseus to the Trojan War, where he became the most ruthless of all the Greeks. He brutally killed King Priam and several other princes during the destruction of the city of Troy, and took away Hector's wife, Andromache, as his prize. The official  was published by the Minor Planet Center on 4 June 1993.

Physical characteristics 

Pyrrhus is an assumed C-type asteroid, while most larger Jupiter trojans are D-type asteroids. It has a typical V–I color index of 0.95 (also see table).

Rotation period 

In September 1996, the first photometric observations Pyrrhus were obtained by Italian astronomer Stefano Mottola using the Bochum 0.61-metre Telescope at ESO's La Silla Observatory in Chile. The lightcurve however showed very little variation. Follow-up observation by Mottola at the Calar Alto Observatory with its 1.2-meter telescope in March 2002 gave a rotation period of  hours with a brightness amplitude of 0.11 magnitude.

Diameter and albedo 

According to the surveys carried out by the NEOWISE mission of NASA's Wide-field Infrared Survey Explorer, The Infrared Astronomical Satellite IRAS, and the Japanese Akari satellite, Pyrrhus measures between 48.36 and 69.93 kilometers in diameter and its surface has an albedo between 0.072 and 0.100. The Collaborative Asteroid Lightcurve Link derives an albedo of 0.0564 and a diameter of 64.26 kilometers based on an absolute magnitude of 9.7.

References

External links 
 Lightcurve Database Query (LCDB), at www.minorplanet.info
 Dictionary of Minor Planet Names, Google books
 Discovery Circumstances: Numbered Minor Planets (5001)-(10000) – Minor Planet Center
 Asteroid 5283 Pyrrhus at the Small Bodies Data Ferret
 
 

005283
Discoveries by Carolyn S. Shoemaker
Named minor planets
19890131